Vasabladet (abbr. VBL) is a Swedish language regional daily newspaper in Ostrobothnia, Finland. In terms of circulation, it is the second largest Swedish newspaper in Finland, behind Hufvudstadsbladet.

History and profile
Vasabladet is the second oldest newspaper in Finland which is still in circulation(following Åbo Underrättelser), the first edition having been published on 7 May 1856. Until 1939, its name was Wasabladet, reflecting the old spelling of the Swedish name for Vaasa. Its headquarters is located in Vaasa (Vasa in Swedish), with local offices located in Jakobstad, Karleby, Närpes and Kristinestad.

Vasabladet is part of and is published by HSS Media. The paper was published six times per week until 2004 when it became one of three Swedish language newspapers in Finland to be published daily, the other two being Hufvudstadsbladet and Jakobstads Tidning. In May 2013, parts of the online news content were locked behind a hard paywall.

In 1989 Vasabladet sold 27,000 copies. In 2009 its circulation was 22,493 copies, most of which were sold in Vaasa and surrounding areas in Ostrobothnia. The circulation of the paper was 19,325 copies in 2013.

References

External links
Vasabladet website

1856 establishments in Finland
Daily newspapers published in Finland
Mass media in Vaasa
Publications established in 1856
Swedish-language newspapers published in Finland